CDV3 may refer to:

 CDV3 (gene), a human gene
 Queen Elizabeth Hospital (Charlottetown)